Jennifer Mills (born 1977) is an Australian novelist, short story writer and poet.

Career 
Mills lived in Alice Springs. She was the winner of the 2008 Marian Eldridge Award for Young Emerging Women Writers, the Pacific Region of the 2008-9 Commonwealth Short Story Competition, and the 2008 Northern Territory Literary Awards: Best Short Story. She was shortlisted for the 2009 Manchester Fiction Prize. Her work has appeared in Meanjin, Island magazine, Overland, Heat, the Griffith Review, The Lifted Brow, Best Australian Stories, and New Australian Stories.

In 2012, Mills was named one of the Sydney Morning Herald's Best Young Australian Novelists. Her essay, Swimming with Aliens, was shortlisted for the 2017 Horne Prize.

She is the fiction editor at Overland and a Board Director for the Australian Society of Authors.

Her 2018 novel, Dyschronia, was shortlisted for the 2019 Miles Franklin Award and the 2019 Adelaide Festival Awards for Literature – Fiction.

Works

Novels 
 The Diamond Anchor (University of Queensland Press, 2009)
 Gone (University of Queensland Press, 2011)
 Dyschronia (Picador Australi), 2018)
The Airways (Picador Australia, 2021)

Short Story Collections 

 The Rest is Weight (University of Queensland Press, 2012)

Poetry 
 Treading Earth, chapbook (Press Press, 2009)

Contributed chapter 
 "Spanners and mirages", pp. 107–118, in: Destroying the joint, edited by Jane Caro, Read How You Want (2015).

References

External links 
 Official website of Jennifer Mills
 UQP Author page
 Picador Author page

Australian women short story writers
Living people
1977 births
Australian women novelists
Australian women poets
21st-century Australian novelists
21st-century Australian poets
21st-century Australian women writers
Writers from the Northern Territory
Chapbook writers
21st-century Australian short story writers